Lovča may refer to:

 Lovča, Slovakia, a village in Slovakia
 Lovča, Croatia, a village near Donji Kukuruzari, Croatia